John Raymond Styler (October 19, 1923 – February 19, 1999) was an American professional basketball player. He played for the Chicago American Gears and the Indianapolis Kautskys in the National Basketball League and averaged 1.7 points per game.

References

1923 births
1999 deaths
American men's basketball players
Basketball players from Chicago
Centers (basketball)
Chicago American Gears players
Forwards (basketball)
Indianapolis Kautskys players